Washington Township is a township in Crawford County, Kansas, United States.  As of the 2010 census, its population was 3,501.

Geography
According to the USGS, it contains five cemeteries: Frontenac City Cemetery located within the City of Frontenac; Sacred Heart Catholic Cemetery, also located within the Frontenac city limits; Garden of Memories, located 3 miles north of Frontenac on US 69 Hwy; Lone Star, Rosebank, Smilie and Union Center all located in rural areas.

Transportation
Washington Township contains two airports or landing strips: Galichia Airport and Youvan Airport.

References

 USGS Geographic Names Information System (GNIS)

External links
 City-Data.com

Townships in Crawford County, Kansas
Townships in Kansas